Daphne Frias (born January 13, 1998) is an American activist from West Harlem, New York City, whose work and advocacy has focused on gun control, voting rights, climate change, environmental and disability justice.

Early life and education 
Frias was born premature at 27 weeks in West Harlem on January 13, 1998, to parents from the Dominican Republic. She has two siblings, and the family spoke Spanish at home during her childhood. At age 3, Frias was diagnosed with cerebral palsy. Frias began her education in a New York City public school, and after fracturing her knee in third grade, divided her time between physical rehabilitation and her academic studies.

Frias attended The Beacon School during her high school years. Her time there greatly influenced her climate activism.

Frias told Vice Magazine in 2019, "There is a waste treatment plant that has been creating pollution in my community for a long time. I didn't realize that wasn't normal until I went to a predominantly affluent neighborhood and saw that they don't have that."

Frias has described her father, a military veteran, as a "hard-core Republican" and stated, "it's made me a better activist because I've had to work harder to find a middle ground." She became part of the first generation in her family to attend college.

During college at the State University of New York at Oswego, she double majored in biology and anthropology and minored in sociology and creating writing. In early 2020, she was accepted into a joint M.D. and M.P.H. degree program in Maryland.

Activism 

Frias began her career in activism after the 2018 Stoneman Douglas High School shooting in Parkland, Florida. While a student at State University of New York at Oswego, Frias became active in organizing efforts to support the gun control advocacy organization March for Our Lives as well as accessible transportation for students to attend the March For Our Lives protest, and was appointed the New York State Director for the organization in August 2018.

In 2018, before the midterm elections, Frias founded the nonprofit organization Box The Ballot to help collect and deliver absentee ballots. By working with college students, the organization collected almost 470,000 absentee ballots. In 2018, Frias also became the lead organizer in New York for Future Coalition, a youth-led voting rights organization, during the Walkout to Vote campaign that encouraged high school students to leave school to vote. As the lead organizer, she coordinated with high school organizers, the local March on the Polls chapter and Gays Against Guns for a Union Square rally and march on election day, when public schools were closed across New York City. She told CNBC before the rally, "Most of us are coming of age in a time of a political sensory overload, but that does not stop us from realizing that we are unhappy with the way our country is going. We've marched and we've rallied and that made people listen."

In July 2019, Frias participated in the 2019 Youth Climate Summit in Miami organized by the youth-led climate justice organization Zero Hour. She was also an official spokesperson at the September 2019 Climate Strike protest in New York City, which was part of coordinated international protests also known as the Global Week for Future.

At age 21, Frias was elected as the West Harlem county committee representative for the Democratic party in New York, and then worked with her staff as a liaison between community members and elected officials. At age 22, in March 2020, Frias contracted COVID-19 and pneumonia. She used social media to share updates about her progress, and told NBC News, "I think me being sick made it a lot more personal for people, and I think that's what people are needing right now, a tangible person to connect to." She later told The Washington Post that the pandemic seemed to shift attention from politics to daily challenges for people, and expressed hope that the shift in focus would continue.

In 2021, while a medical school student, Frias attended COP26 as a speaker for The New York Times Generation Climate Initiative. During the conference, she participated in discussion forums organized by The New York Times about leadership. She told The New York Times, "We always say our leaders have failed us. We are the new leaders. We are the ones who are going to make the decisions going forward."

Personal life 
Frias has cerebral palsy and uses a wheelchair to ambulate.

In August 2022, Frias announced that she has been diagnosed with Stage Four Hodgkin’s Lymphoma. She is currently undergoing chemotherapy.

References

External links 

 Valerie Novack & Daphne Frias, Climate Change, Environmental Activism, and Disability Stanford Social Innovation Review, 2022

Activists from New York City
People from Harlem
American disability rights activists
Youth climate activists
Living people
People with cerebral palsy
1998 births
State University of New York at Oswego alumni